Thomas Geoffrey Wilkinson  (born 5 February 1948) is a British actor of film, television, and stage. He has received various accolades throughout his career, including a BAFTA Award, a Golden Globe, a Primetime Emmy Award and nominations for two Academy Awards. 

For his role in comedy film The Full Monty (1997) he received the BAFTA Award for Best Actor in a Supporting Role. He's received two Academy Award nominations, one for Best Actor for In the Bedroom (2001) and the other for Best Supporting Actor for Michael Clayton (2007).

Some of his notable films include In the Name of the Father (1993), Sense and Sensibility (1995), The Full Monty (1997), Shakespeare in Love (1998), The Patriot (2000), Girl with a Pearl Earring (2003), Eternal Sunshine of the Spotless Mind (2004), Batman Begins (2005), Valkyrie (2008), The Best Exotic Marigold Hotel (2011), Selma (2014), The Grand Budapest Hotel (2014), and Denial (2016).

In 2009, he won a Golden Globe Award and a Primetime Emmy Award for Best Supporting Actor in a Miniseries or Film for playing Benjamin Franklin in the HBO limited series John Adams (2008).

Early life and education
Wilkinson was born on 5 February 1948 in Wharfedale, West Riding of Yorkshire, the son of Marjorie and Thomas Wilkinson, a farmer. At the age of 11, the family moved to Kitimat, British Columbia, in Canada, where they lived for five years before returning to the United Kingdom and running a pub in Cornwall. Wilkinson graduated in English and American literature from the University of Kent at Canterbury, while at university, Wilkinson became preoccupied with acting and directing with the University of Kent Drama Society (now called T24 Drama Society). After finishing his degree, Wilkinson then attended the Royal Academy of Dramatic Art in London, graduating in 1973.

Career
Wilkinson made his acting debut in 1976 and worked on several British television series, most notably the mini-series First Among Equals (1986). He first gained critical acclaim with his appearance as Mr Pecksniff, in the BBC's 1994 adaptation of Martin Chuzzlewit. Wilkinson made only the occasional film, including a brief appearance in 1995's Sense and Sensibility and a villain in The Ghost and the Darkness (1996). After becoming part of the ensemble cast of the comedy drama The Full Monty in 1997, a role which earned him a BAFTA, he began to take film roles more frequently, including supporting roles in Oscar and Lucinda, Wilde, Shakespeare in Love, and The Patriot. He also starred with Jackie Chan and Chris Tucker in the 1998 film Rush Hour, as the evil British Ambassador/Juntao.

His portrayal of Matt Fowler, in Todd Field's In the Bedroom, received international praise from critics. For the role, he was named Best Actor of the Year by the New York Film Critics' Circle, and went on to be nominated for the Academy Award for Best Actor. That success was followed up by Eternal Sunshine of the Spotless Mind, Normal, The Exorcism of Emily Rose, Batman Begins, and Separate Lies.

In 2007, Wilkinson played Arthur Edens, an attorney with bipolar disorder, in Michael Clayton and garnered much critical acclaim and a nomination for the Academy Award for Best Supporting Actor. The same year, he played an uncle planning for murder in Woody Allen’s Cassandra's Dream, and played opposite Billy Crudup as children's book writing partners in Dedication.

In 2008, Wilkinson portrayed American polymath Benjamin Franklin in the HBO mini-series John Adams. In the HBO film, Recount, Wilkinson portrayed American political adviser and lawyer, James A. Baker, in Baker's capacity as Chief Counsel to George W. Bush during the 2000 U.S. Presidential Election, receiving an Emmy Award for the former and a nomination for the latter. He also received a Golden Globe Award and Screen Actors' Guild Award nomination for his role in John Adams. He also portrayed Friedrich Fromm, Commander in Chief of the German Reserve Army, alongside Tom Cruise in the 2008 World War II thriller Valkyrie.

In 2010, Wilkinson starred in the horror comedy Burke and Hare, which was directed by John Landis. He portrayed a covert CIA agent in Roman Polanski's The Ghost Writer. He played another historical character, Joseph P. Kennedy Sr., in the 2011 television miniseries The Kennedys, for which he was nominated for the Primetime Emmy Award for Outstanding Supporting Actor in a Miniseries or a Movie. He and his wife portrayed husband and wife Joe and Rose Kennedy. Earlier that year, he appeared in The Green Hornet and Mission: Impossible – Ghost Protocol.

In 2014, Wilkinson portrayed Lyndon B. Johnson, the 36th President of the United States, in the historical drama film Selma. In 2016, he portrayed journalist Ewen MacAskill in Snowden and barrister Richard Rampton in Denial.

Personal life
Wilkinson lives in North London with his wife, actress Diana Hardcastle. They have two daughters together, Alice (born in 1989) and Molly (born in 1991).

Honours
Wilkinson received a Doctor of Letters honorary degree from the University of Kent in July 2001.

In the 2005 New Year Honours, he was appointed Officer of the Order of the British Empire (OBE) "for services to Drama".

The 6 November 2017 issue of American web comic Girl Genius has an airship from the United Kingdom called "HMA Tom Wilkinson"

Filmography

Film

Television

Video games

Awards and nominations

References

External links

 
 

1948 births
Living people
20th-century English male actors
21st-century English male actors
Alumni of RADA
Alumni of the University of Kent
Audiobook narrators
Best Supporting Actor BAFTA Award winners
Best Supporting Actor Golden Globe (television) winners
English male film actors
English male stage actors
English male television actors
English male voice actors
Independent Spirit Award for Best Male Lead winners
Male actors from Kent
Male actors from Yorkshire
Officers of the Order of the British Empire
Outstanding Performance by a Supporting Actor in a Miniseries or Movie Primetime Emmy Award winners
Outstanding Performance by a Cast in a Motion Picture Screen Actors Guild Award winners
People from Craven District
Sundance Film Festival award winners